Sudarshan Kumar is an Indian politician from Bihar and a two-time member of the Bihar Legislative Assembly. He won the first time from Indian National Congress and the  won second time from Barbigha Assembly constituency on the Janata Dal (United) ticket in the 2020 Bihar Legislative Assembly election. He is a grandson of Rajo Singh who was a two-time MP from Begusarai Lok Sabha and was also elected as an MLA five times from Sheikhpura and once from Barbigha. His father, Sanjay Kumar Singh, was MLA from Sheikhpura twice, and his mother, Shrimati Sunila Devi, was MLA of INC twice from the Sheikhpura constituency. Kumar is a life member of the People's Association for Research & Development working in pan India but his major work in Bihar.

References

Living people
Bihar MLAs 2015–2020
Bihar MLAs 2020–2025
Janata Dal (United) politicians
Year of birth missing (living people)
People from Sheikhpura district
Indian National Congress politicians
Indian National Congress politicians from Bihar